Jairo Ramos Gizzi   (born 21 July 1971) is a Venezuela-born Italian baseball first baseman. Ramos bats and throws left-handed. He currently plays for the T & A San Marino club of the Italian Baseball League.

As a member of the Italy national baseball team, Ramos competed in the 2004 Summer Olympics and won the 2010 European Baseball Championship.

Ramos, who debuted in the Italian League  with Grosseto BBC in 1998, connected his 100th home run in the circuit during the 2013 season, as well as his 1,000th hit in 2014.

In between, Ramos played winter ball for the Leones del Caracas, Cardenales de Lara, Tiburones de La Guaira and Pastora de los Llanos clubs of the Venezuelan Professional Baseball League in a span of 19 seasons from 1989–2007. He also represented Venezuela in the 2006 Caribbean Series.

References

1971 births
2016 European Baseball Championship players
Living people
Baseball first basemen
Baseball players at the 2004 Summer Olympics
Cardenales de Lara players
Grosseto Baseball Club players
Leones del Caracas players
Olympic baseball players of Italy
Pastora de los Llanos players
People from La Guaira
T & A San Marino players
Expatriate baseball players in San Marino
Tiburones de La Guaira players
Venezuelan baseball players
Venezuelan expatriate baseball players in Italy